This is a list of some of the notable international and national gymnastics competitions.

Acrobatic gymnastics (FIG)

Official competitions
Acrobatic Gymnastics World Championships (1974–)
FIG World Age Group Competitions (2001–)
FIG World Cup series (2001–)
World Games (1993–)
Youth Olympic Games (2018–)

Multi-sport events

Senior
European Games (2015–)

Championships

Junior
Acrobatic Gymnastics European Age Group Competition (2005–)
Acrobatic Gymnastics Pan American Age Group Competition (2015–)
Junior European Acrobatic Gymnastics Championships (1996–)

International
Asian Gymnastics Championships (1992–)
European Acrobatics Championships (1978–)
Pan American Gymnastics Championships (2015–)
WOGA Classic (1994–)

Defunct championships
FIG World Cup Final (2003–2007)
IFSA Acrobatic Gymnastics Junior World Championships (1989–1999)
IFSA World Cup (1975–1993)

Aerobic gymnastics (FIG)

Official competitions
Aerobic Gymnastics World Age Group Competitions (2004–)
Aerobic Gymnastics World Championships (1995–)
FIG Aerobic Gymnastics World Cup series (1999–)
World Games (1997–)

Multi-sport events

Youth
Gymnasiade (2013)

Senior
African Games (2015–)
European Games (2015–)
Southeast Asian Games (2003–2007, 2011)
Summer Universiade (2011)

Defunct events
Asian Indoor Games (2005–2009)

Championships

International
Aerobic Gymnastics European Championships (1999–)
Asian Gymnastics Championships (2009–)
Pan American Gymnastics Championships (1999–)
South American Gymnastics Championships

National
US National Aerobic Championships (United States)

Defunct championships
FIG Aerobic Gymnastics World Cup Final (2001–2007)

Aesthetic group gymnastics (IFAAG)

Official competitions
IFAAG Aesthetic Group Gymnastics World Championships (2000–)
IFAAG Aesthetic Group Gymnastics Junior World Championships (2009–)
IFAAG Aesthetic Group Gymnastics World Cup and Challenge Cup (2009–)

Multi-sport events

Youth
SELL Student Games

Championships

International
Aesthetic Group Gymnastics European Championships (2016–)
Four Continents Aesthetic Group Gymnastics Championships (2014–)
Miss Valentine
Pan American Aesthetic Group Gymnastics Championships (2017–)

Artistic gymnastics (FIG)

Official competitions

Multi-sport events

Youth
Asian Youth Games  (2021)
Australian Youth Olympic Festival (2001–2013)
Commonwealth Youth Games (2004, 2011)
European Youth Summer Olympic Festival (1993–)
Gymnasiade
Junior Pan American Games (2021)
South American Youth Games (2013–)
Youth Commonwealth Games (2004–2011)

Senior
African Games (1991–2007, 2015–)
Bolivarian Games (1965–)
Asian Games (1974–)
Central American and Caribbean Games (1946–1959, 1970–)
Central American Games
Commonwealth Games (1978–)
European Games (2015–)
Games of the Small States of Europe (1997, 2007–2009, 2013–2015)
Islamic Solidarity Games (2017)
Island Games (1989–2013, 2017–)
Maccabiah Games
Mediterranean Games (1951–)
Military World Games (2019)
Pan American Games (1951–)
South American Games (1978–)
Southeast Asian Games (1979–1981, 1985–1997, 2001–2007, 2011, 2015–)
Summer Universiade (1961–)

Disability
Special Olympics World Games
Summer Deaflympics (1928, 1957–1969)

Defunct events
ALBA Games (2005-2011)
East Asian Games (1993–2013)
Goodwill Games (1986–2001)
Pan American Sports Festival (2014)
Pan Arab Games (1953–2011)
West Asian Games (2002–2005)

Championships

International
American Cup (1976–)
Asian Gymnastics Championships (1996–)
City of Jesolo Trophy (2008–)
European Artistic Gymnastics Championships (1955–)
Northern European Gymnastics Championships (2005–)
Pacific Rim Championships (1988–)
Pan American Gymnastics Championships (1997–)
South American Gymnastics Championships (1957–)
WOGA Classic

National
Canadian Gymnastics Championships (Canada)
Nastia Liukin Cup (United States)
NCAA Men's Gymnastics Championships (United States, college gymnastics)
NCAA Women's Gymnastics Championships (United States, college gymnastics)
Romanian Gymnastics National Championships (Romania)
Russian Artistic Gymnastics Championships (Russia)
U.S. Classic (United States)
USA Gymnastics National Championships (United States)

Defunct championships
Artistic Gymnastics World Cup Final (1975–2008)

Gymnastics for all (FIG)

Official events
World Gym For Life Challenge
World Gymnaestrada

Parkour (FIG)

Official competitions
Parkour World Cup series (2018–)
Parkour World Championships (2022–)

Multi-sport events

Senior
World Games (2021–)
World Urban Games (2019–)

Rhythmic gymnastics (FIG)

Official competitions

Multi-sport events

Youth
Australian Youth Olympic Festival (2001–2013)
Gymnasiade

Senior
Asian Games (1994–)
Black Sea Games (2007–)
Bolivarian Games (2001–)
Central American and Caribbean Games (1998–)
Commonwealth Games (1998, 2006–)
European Games (2015–)
Games of the Small States of Europe (2009)
Islamic Solidarity Games (2017)
Maccabiah Games
Mediterranean Games (2005–)
Pan American Games (1987–)
South American Games (1990–)
Southeast Asian Games
Summer Universiade (1991–)

Disability
Special Olympics World Games

Defunct events
ALBA Games (2005–2011)
Friendship Games (1984)
Goodwill Games (1986–2001)
Pan American Sports Festival (2014)

Championships

International
Asian Gymnastics Championships (1996–)
Commonwealth Rhythmic Gymnastics Championship
Miss Valentine (2013–)
Pacific Rim Championships (1996–)
Pan American Gymnastics Championships (1997–)
Rhythmic Gymnastics Grand Prix (1994–)
South American Gymnastics Championships

National
French Rhythmic Gymnastics Championships
Italian Rhythmic Gymnastics Championships
Polish Rhythmic Gymnastics Championships
Russian Rhythmic Gymnastics Championships 
Slovenian Rhythmic Gymnastics Championships
Spanish Rhythmic Gymnastics Championships

Defunct championships
Baltic Sea Games (1993–1997)
Rhythmic Gymnastics World Cup Final (1983–2008)
Four Continents Rhythmic Gymnastics Championships (1978–2001)

TeamGym (UEG)

Official competitions
UEG European TeamGym Championships (1996–)

Trampoline and tumbling (FIG)

Official competitions
Trampoline World Championships (1964–)
Trampoline Gymnastics World Age Group Competitions (FIT and FIG) (1973–)
World Games (1981–)
Trampoline World Cup (FIT) and Trampoline World Cup series (FIG) (1984–)
Summer Olympic Games (2000–)
Youth Olympic Games (2010–)

Multi-sport events

Youth
Australian Youth Olympic Festival (2001–2013)

Senior
Asian Games (2006–)
Central American and Caribbean Games (2014–)
European Games (2015–)
Island Games (1993)
Pan American Games (1955–1959, 2011–)
South American Games (1978–1982, 2018–)

Defunct events
Pan American Sports Festival (2014)
Pan Arab Games (2011)

Championships

International
Asian Gymnastics Championships (2014–)
European Trampoline Championships (1969–)
Pacific Rim Championships (1988–)
Pan American Gymnastics Championships (2004–)
South American Gymnastics Championships (2013–)

Defunct championships
Trampoline World Cup Final (1993–2008)

Wheel gymnastics (IRV)

Official competitions
IRV Wheel Gymnastics World Championships (1995–)
IRV Wheel Gymnastics Team World Cup (2002–)

External links
 International Federation of Gymnastics (FIG) official website - Acrobatic, aerobic, artistic, rhythmic and trampoline gymnastics
 International Federation of Aesthetic Group Gymnastics (IFAAG) official website - Aesthetic group gymnastics
 European Union of Gymnastics (UEG) official website - TeamGym
 International Wheel Gymnastics Federation (IRV) official website - Wheel gymnastics

Competitions